Fabrice Lhomme (born 1965) is a French investigative journalist for Le Monde.

Early life
Fabrice Lhomme was born on 17 November 1965. He was educated in a boarding school in Normandy. He attended François Rabelais University in Tours, where he studied History and Journalism, but he failed to graduate.

Career
Lhomme became a journalist for Le Parisien in 1989. He has been an investigative journalist for Le Monde since 2011.

Lhomme is the co-author of several books with Gérard Davet. Two books, Sarko m'a tuer and Sarko s'est tuer, are about President Nicolas Sarkozy. Another book, L'homme qui voulut être roi, is about Gaston Flosse. Two more books, French corruption and La clef : révélations sur la fraude fiscale du siècle, are about allegations of political corruptions and tax evasion in France. Their sixth book, "Un président ne devrait pas dire ça...", is based on interviews with President Francois Hollande.

Works

References

Living people
1965 births
University of Tours alumni
French investigative journalists